Gizab (Pashto/) is the capital of the Gizab District of Daykundi Province, Afghanistan. It is located along the Helmand River.

History
Gizab was transferred in 2004 from Uruzgan Province to Daykundi Province, and then re-annexed to Uruzgan Province in 2006. Later, it was transferred to Daykundi Province now with New Government it transferred back to Uruzgan.

Climate
With an influence from the local steppe climate, Gizab features a continental semi-arid (BSk) under the Köppen climate classification. The average temperature in Gizab is 13.3 °C, while the annual precipitation averages 453 mm.

July is the hottest month of the year with an average temperature of 27.8 °C. The coldest month January has an average temperature of -3.6 °C.

See also
 Daykundi Province
 Loy Kandahar

References

Populated places in Daykundi Province